Enrico Rossi (September 8, 1856 in Naples – 1916) was an Italian painter.

He studied painting at the Royal Institute of Fine Arts of Naples under the direction of professors Domenico Morelli and Filippo Palizzi. He won a series of awards for figure paintings at Milan and at the  Promotrice of Naples. At Milan he had two genre subjects. Giulia Masucci was one of his pupils. He also illustrated books including a Collection of Neapolitan Songs by Salvatore Di Giacomo

References

1856 births
1916 deaths
19th-century Italian painters
Italian male painters
20th-century Italian painters
Painters from Naples
19th-century Italian male artists
20th-century Italian male artists